Vladimir Sergeyevich Shabrov (born 15 March 1930; died 12 May 1990) was a Soviet football player.  From 1961 until his death he worked as a diplomatic courier.

Honours
 Soviet Top League winner: 1954, 1955, 1957, 1959.
 Soviet Cup winner: 1953.

International career
Shabrov made his debut for USSR on 16 August 1955 in a friendly against India, scoring two goals on his debut.

Career statistics

International goals

References

External links
  Profile

1930 births
Footballers from Moscow
1990 deaths
Russian footballers
Soviet footballers
Association football forwards
Soviet Union international footballers
Soviet Top League players
FC Dynamo Moscow players